Brundinia is a genus of beetles belonging to the family Staphylinidae.

The genus was first described by Tottenham in 1949.

The species of this genus are found in Europe and America.

Species:
 Brundinia marina
 Brundinia meridionalis

References

Aleocharinae
Staphylinidae genera